Ruth Symes is the author of children's books and TV scripts including several episodes of Channel 4 / Jim Henson Company's series for pre-school children The Hoobs, and award-winning animation series PicMe. She has also worked with Channel 4 as the Writing Coach and Write a Children's Short Story competition Judge on the Richard & Judy show. One of her books Mondays at Monster School (Orion, 2005) was read on BBC television by Jenny Seagrove as part of the bedtime story hour.

Ruth Symes also writes for both adults and children under the pseudonym Megan Rix, with eight middle grade novels published by Puffin Books, and a Sunday Times bestselling adult memoir published by Penguin's Michael Joseph imprint.

Biography
Raised in Enfield where she attended the Bishop Stopford's School at Enfield, Ruth Symes initially taught children with special needs before becoming an author.  Her first novel was the Carnegie Medal-nominated The Master of Secrets published in 1999.

Before turning to writing professionally Ruth had a variety of jobs including teaching children with severe learning challenges – both in the UK and Singapore - where she was actively involved with the South East Asian Special Olympics.

Other jobs have included instructing aerobics, acting in a Chinese soap opera and playing the part of Jill Goose in the pantomime Mother Goose.

In 2006 she moved to Kempston with her husband Eric Wainwright.

Published works

Novels
 The Master of Secrets (Puffin Books; 1997)
 The Mum Trap (Andersen Press ; 2000), which was voted in the top 100 children's books of 2000
 Frankie's Romeo (Orion; 2002), which received a PAWS drama award in 2001.
 Bella Donna: Coven Road (Piccadilly Press; 2010)
 Bella Donna: Too Many Spells (Piccadilly Press; 2011)
 Bella Donna: Witchling (Piccadilly Press; 2011)
 Bella Donna: Cat Magic (Piccadilly Press; 2012)
 Bella Donna: Witch Camp (Piccadilly Press; 2013)
 Bella Donna: Bella Bewitched (Piccadilly Press; 2013)
 The Secret Animal Society: Cornflake the Dragon (Piccadilly Press; 2014)
 The Secret Animal Society: Spike the Sea Serpent (Piccadilly Press; 2015)
 The Secret Animal Society: Snowball the Baby Bigfoot (Piccadilly Press; 2015)

Picture books
 The Sheep Fairy (Chicken House ; 2003)
 Floppy Ears (Orion; 2004)
 Mondays at Monster School (Orion; 2005)
 Harriet Dancing (Chicken House; 2008)
 Little Tail (Orion; 2006)
 Little Rex (Piccadilly Press; 2010)
 Little Rex, Big Brother (Piccadilly Press, UK; Albert Whitman and Company, USA; 2010)

Young readers 
 Play - if you Dare
 The Twelfth Floor Kids
 Chip's Dad
 Smelly Sock Soup
 The Sarah Song

Radio 
 Big Toe Radio Show for BBC 7
 Adapted The Sun, Moon and Stars for BBC Radio 4

Writing as Megan Rix
Winston and the Marmalade Cat
The Great Fire Dogs
Echo Come Home
The Great Escape
The Victory Dogs
The Bomber Dog
A Soldier's Friend
The Runaways
The Hero Pup
The Puppy That Came For Christmas

References

External links
 Official site
 Ruth's biography on Chicken House website

English children's writers
1962 births
Living people
People from Enfield, London
People educated at Bishop Stopford's School at Enfield
English women novelists